Dancing Feet may refer to:

 Dancing Feet (film), a 1936 American comedy film
 "Dancing Feet" (song), a song by Kygo featuring DNCE
 Dancing Feet (album), a 1987 album by The Tannahill Weavers